Camden Base is a small airstrip in Couva, Trinidad. Crop dusting aircraft use this airstrip; drag racing also takes place on the airstrip. The Camden (Field) Auxiliary Air Base was established as an emergency airstrip. It included one paved 3,000 ft (910 m) x 75 ft (46 m) runway with extensive taxiways and dispersed camouflaged parking bays for USAAC, USN and RN. It was defended by US Army infantry and AAA units.

On 24 May 2011, Prime Minister Kamla Persad-Bissessar, at the one-year anniversary celebratory rally marking the election of her coalition government to power, announced that the airstrip will be upgraded initially to a domestic airport to serve the Trinidad-Tobago airbridge. If successful, the airport would be upgraded to a full-scale international airport.

If upgraded, the airport will be the third international airport on the islands after Piarco International Airport in Trinidad and the A.N.R. Robinson International Airport in Tobago.

Operations
Aerial World Service Ltd
https://web.archive.org/web/20161124102334/https://aerialworldservicesltd.com/
A state of the art flight school that offers training from private pilot, all the way through to commercial pilot on technically advanced aircraft. They also offer private flights.

National Helicopter Services Limited NHSL

University of Trinidad and Tobago UTT operates an aviation campus.

References

Airports in Trinidad and Tobago
Drag racing venues
Motorsport venues in Trinidad and Tobago
Airfields of the United States Army Air Forces in the Caribbean, Central, and South America